Philippe Simo is a Cameroonian judoka. He competed in the men's half-middleweight event at the 1980 Summer Olympics.

References

Year of birth missing (living people)
Living people
Cameroonian male judoka
Olympic judoka of Cameroon
Judoka at the 1980 Summer Olympics
Place of birth missing (living people)
20th-century Cameroonian people